This is a list of women who have been involved with producing comic books and comic strips. Many notable female comics creators exist even though the field of comics creation is traditionally male-dominated.

Africa

Congo
 Fifi Mukuna

Egypt
 Bahiga Thomassian, aka Bhiga
 Amaal Khattab

Gabon
 Sophie Endamne

Ivory Coast
Marguerite Abouet - (writer of Aya of Yop City)

Madagascar
 Jenny
 M'Aa - (makes comics together with her husband Xhi)

Mauritius
 Annick Sadonnet, aka Sadon, Ajol or Sade

Tanzania
 Martha Gellege - (Anti Bwalo)

South Africa
 Karen Botha
 Marieke Blomerus
 Marisa Cloete - (Gebuza, To Dig a Big Hole)
 Lara-Ann Jibrail
 Mariette Kemp
 Sian Kuiken
 Ingrid van der Merwe
 Ina van Zyl

Americas

Argentina
 Maitena Burundarena - Superadas
 Gisela Dester
 Isol
 Daniela Kantor
 María Delia Lozupone

Brazil
Erica Awano - Holy Avenger
Chantal - (Juventude)
Priscila Farias
Raquel Gompy
Seung Joo-Kang - (Disney comics)
Ana-Luiza Koehler - (Awrah)
Adriana Melo - notable for her work on the Star Wars: Empire franchise
Bianca Pinheiro
Germana Viana

Canada
Isabelle Arsenault
Kate Beaton
Sandra Bell-Lundy - Between Friends
Sheree Bradford-Lea
 Peti Buchel
Emily Carroll
Svetlana Chmakova - Dramacon (Tokyopop)
Julie Delporte
Julie Doucet
Susan Dewar
Leanne Franson
 Odette Fumet (newspaper comic strip adaptations of swashbuckler novels), dies at age 94.
Pia Guerra - artist, Vertigo's Y The Last Man
Lynn Johnston - For Better or For Worse.
Molly Kiely
Sophie Labelle
Yvette Lapointe - Les Petits Espiègles
Kate Leth - writer, Bravest Warriors (Boom! Comics), Edward Scissorhands (IDW), Adventure Time (Boom! Comics)
Gisèle Lagacé - Cool Cat Studio, Penny and Aggie, Ménage à 3
Sam Maggs - Marvel Action: Captain Marvel, Rick & Morty Ever After, Transformers, My Little Pony
Maia Matches (born in Canada, later moved to the Netherlands)
Caroline Merola
Diane Obomsawin
Rina Piccolo - (Six Chix, Tina's Groove)
Doris Slater
Fiona Staples - Saga
Jillian Tamaki - Skim and This One Summer
Olga Urbansky - Sergeant Renfrew, based on the comedy character by Dave Broadfoot
Chrissie Zullo
Zviane

Mexico
Cecilia Pego

United States

Platinum Age (1897–1937)
Nell Brinkley - (The Brinkley Girl)
Mildred Burleigh - (Pigtails)
Dot Cochran - (Dot and Dodo, Me and My Boyfriend)
Fanny Cory - (Other People's Children, Sonny Sayings, Little Miss Muffet)
Grace G. Drayton - (Dolly Drake and Bobby Blake in Storyland, The Terrible Tales of Captain Kiddo, Toodles, Dolly Dimples, The Campbell Kids, The Pussycat Princess)
Edwina Dumm - (Cap Stubbs and Tippie)
Lovrien Gregory - (The Pioneers)
Carol Hager - (continued The Adventures of Waddles)
Ethel Hays - (Ethel, Flapper Fanny Says, Marianne, Vic and Ethel).
Margaret G. Hays - (Jennie and Jack, Also The Little Dog Jap)
Mary A. Hays - (Kate and Karol, the Cranford Kids).
Louise Hirsch - (Tessie Tish, Charlie Chirps)
Virginia Huget - (Gentlemen Prefer Blondes, Flora's Fling, Campus Capers, Miss Aladdin, Molly the Manicure Girl, continued Skippy and Oh Diana).
Fay King - (1910s-1930s cartoons and early autobiographical comics)
Rose O'Neill - (Kewpie)
Marjorie Organ - (Reggie and the Heavenly Twins, Strange What a Difference a Mere Man Makes, The Wrangle Sisters
Louise Quarles - (Bun's Puns)
Katharine P. Rice - (Flora Flirt)
Inez Townsend (born in the U.K., later moved to the U.S.) - (Gretchen Gratz, Snooks and Snicks, the Mischievous Twins).
Dorothy Urfer - (Annibelle)

Golden Age/Silver Age (1930s-c. 1970)
Nina Albright - (artist for comics packager Bernard Baily Studio)
 Rosie Arima - (Chig, Li'l Eva-Cue)
Ruth Atkinson a.k.a. Ruth Atkinson Ford, R. Atkinson - (worked for Fiction House, Timely Comics, Lev Gleason Publications)
Violet Barclay - (worked as an inker for Timely/Atlas Comics)
Toni Blum - (writer for Eisner & Iger)
Ann Brewster
Hannah Carter - (continued her husband, Ad Carter's series Just Kids as Mush Stebbins and his Sister.)
Fanny Cory - (Little Miss Muffet)
Jill Elgin - (continued Girl Commandos).
Linda Fite - (writer for The Cat, Marvel Comics)
Ramona Fradon - (worked on Aquaman and Metamorpho, DC Comics, drew Brenda Starr, Reporter)
Barbara Hall - (drew for Black Cat, Girl Commandos, the Blonde Bomber)
Ray Herman - (1940s editor at Holyoke Publishing and elsewhere.)
Patricia Highsmith - (worked for Nedor/Standard/Better Comics and others)
Virginia Hubbell - (Charles Biro's ghost writer, Lev Gleason Publications' Crime Does Not Pay).
Alice Kirkpatrick
Virginia Krausmann - (continued Annibelle and Marianne)
Lee Marrs - (worked for Star Reach)
Alice Marble - (associate editor on Wonder Woman from 1941-1945, creator/writer of Wonder Women of History feature from 1942-1946)
Elizabeth Holloway Marston - (co-creator of Wonder Woman)
Joye Hummel - (wrote several scripts of Wonder Woman when the original script writer, William Moulton Marston, was too ill to continue on his own.)
Tarpe Mills, pseudonym of June Mills - (Cat-Man (Holyoke Comics), Miss Fury)
Jackie Ormes - (Torchy Brown, Patty-Jo 'n' Ginger).
Ramone Patenaude, aka Pat
Albertine Randall - (The Dumbunnies)
Lily Renée a.k.a. Reney (Lily Renée Wilhelms Peters and Lily Renée Phlllips) - (worked for Fiction House and St. John Publications)
Ruth Roche - (writer of Phantom Lady (Fox Comics))
Marie Severin - (worked for EC and Marvel Comics)
Barbara Shermund
Virginia Smith - (co-creator of The Smith Family).
Marcia Snyder - (worked for Fiction House)
Daisy Swayze - (lettered for Fawcett Comics, sister of artist Marc Swayze)
 Esther Takei - (Ama-Chan)
 Mercy Van Vlack - (Miranda the Tease, Green Ghost and Lotus)
Linda Walter - (Susie Q. Smith and as illustrator Bunty)
Tatjana Wood - (colorist)
Dorothy Woolfolk a.k.a. Dorothy Roubicek - (DC Comics' first woman editor)

Bronze Age and Modern Age
Laura Allred
Sana Amanat - editor, Ms. Marvel (Marvel)
Sarah Andersen - creator, Sarah's Scribbles; co-creator, Cheshire Crossing
Fiona Avery
Samm Barnes - Marvel Comics writer
Amber Benson - writer, Buffy the Vampire Slayer (Dark Horse Comics)
Karen Berger - editor, DC Comics' Vertigo imprint
Christina Blanch - writer, editor, Good Boy [Mysterium]]  [The Damnation of Charlie Wormwood]]
Maddie Blaustein - writer, Milestone Comics' Hardware
June Brigman - artist and co-creator, Power Pack (Marvel Comics); final artist Brenda Starr, Reporter comic strip (1995-2011)
Madeline Brogan
Sarah Byam - writer, Black Canary (DC Comics), Mode Extreme (Marvel/Razorline)
Roz Chast  - New Yorker staff cartoonist The Party After You Left: Collected Cartoons 1995-2003
Bobbie Chase - Marvel Comics editor
Jo Chen - cover artist, Dark Horse Comics's Buffy the Vampire Slayer Season Eight
Joyce Chin - artist, Wynonna Earp (IDW),
Becky Cloonan - writer and artist.
Nancy A. Collins - writer, DC/Vertigo's Swamp Thing
Amanda Conner - artist, The Pro (Image Comics), Disney's Gargoyles (Marvel Comics)
Colleen Coover - writer and artist.
Rosario Dawson - writer and co-creator, Occult Crimes Taskforce Image Comics
Kelly Sue DeConnick - writer, Captain Marvel, Avengers Assemble (Marvel)
Tania del Rio - artist/writer, Sabrina the Teenage Witch (Archie Comics)
Rachel Dodson - inker, Marvel and DC
Colleen Doran - writer and artist, A Distant Soil (Image Comics)
Valerie D'Orazio - assistant editor, DC Comics
Leigh Dragoon - artist, By the Wayside
Jo Duffy a.k.a. Mary Jo Duffy - writer and Marvel Comics editor
Jan Duursema - artist, Star Wars: Legacy (Dark Horse Comics)
Mary Fleener - artist and writer, Slutburger
Kaja Foglio - writer and co-creator, Girl Genius (Studio Foglio)
Robin Furth - plotter, The Dark Tower: The Gunslinger Born (Marvel Comics)
Shaenon K. Garrity - writer, Marvel Comics' Marvel Holiday Special
Megan Rose Gedris - writer, artist and creator, YU+ME:dream, I Was Kidnapped by Lesbian Pirates from Outer Space (Platinum Studios)
Stephanie Gladden
Devin Grayson - writer, Arsenal, Batman: Gotham Knights, Catwoman, Nightwing (all DC Comics)
Pia Guerra - artist, Vertigo's Y The Last Man
Stephanie Hans - artist and co-creator, DIE (Image comics), cover artist (Marvel, DC, Dark Horse, BOOM)
Judith Hunt - co-writer, co-creator, artist Evangeline (Comico)1984 and online comic Evangeline (August 2008)
Jody Houser - writer, Faith (Valiant Comics), Mother Panic (Young Animal), Supergirl (DC Comics), Vox Machina Origins (Dark Horse)
Jenna Jameson - creator and plotter, Shadow Hunter (Virgin Comics)
Avy Jetter - creator Nuthin' Good Ever Happens at 4 a.m
Jenette Kahn - editor and executive, DC Comicshttps://imagecomics.com/creators/stephanie-hans
Carol Kalish - executive, Marvel Comics
Shawn Kerri - cartoonist, Cracked, CARtoons Magazine
Barbara Kesel a.k.a. Barbara Randall Kesel - writer, Rogue Angel: Teller of Tall Tales (IDW Publishing)
Irene Koh - artist of The Legend of Korra: Turf Wars, creator of Afrina and the Glass Coffin
Kim Krizan - writer, BOOM! Studio comics
Elaine Lee - writer, Vamps (DC Comics), Saint Sinner (Marvel/Razorline)
Marjorie Liu - writer, X-23, Black Widow, Dark Wolverine, NYX, Astonishing X-Men (Marvel Comics)
Nilah Magruder - writer, artist, illustrator, animator
Cynthia Martin - artist for (among others) Marvel Comics's Star Wars
Laura Martin - colorist, Planetary (DC Comics/WildStorm), Astonishing X-Men (Marvel Comics), Ruse (CrossGen)
Tara McPherson - cover artist, Vertigo
Adriana Melo - artist, Ms. Marvel (Marvel Comics)
Denise Mina - writer, Vertigo's Hellblazer
Leah Moore - writer, Wildstorm's Albion
Mindy Newell - writer/editor, Marvel, DC, and First
Ann Nocenti - writer, Daredevil (Marvel Comics)
Sonia Oback - colorist, "Uncanny X-Men", "X-23: Target X" (Marvel Comics)
Glynis Oliver - colorist, X-Men (Marvel Comics)
Sara Pichelli - artist, Ultimate Comics: Spider-Man, Guardians of the Galaxy (Marvel Comics)
Jodi Picoult - writer, DC's Wonder Woman
Tamora Pierce - writer, Marvel Comics' White Tiger
Wendy Pini - artist and co-creator, Elfquest (WaRP Graphics), and Masque of the Red Death (Go! Comi)
Janice Race - editor, DC Comics
Barb Rausch
Amy Reeder - artist and co-creator, Rocket Girl (Image Comics)
Emma Rios - artist, "Pretty Deadly"
Trina Robbins - artist, Warren Publishing
Sara Ryan - writer, Me and Edith Head
Nicola Scott - artist, Birds of Prey (DC Comics)
Diana Schutz - editor, Dark Horse Comics
Erica Schultz - writer, "Daredevil Annual" 2018, "Revenge: The Secret Origin of Emily Thorne" (Marvel Comics)
Cara Sherman Tereno
Gail Simone - writer, Birds of Prey, Wonder Woman (all DC Comics)
Louise Simonson a.k.a. Louise Jones - Marvel Comics editor; writer and co-creator, Power Pack (Marvel Comics);
Mary Skrenes - writer and co-creator, Omega the Unknown (Marvel Comics)
Barbara Slate
Roxanne Starr - letterer
Christina Strain - colorist, Runaways and Spider-Man Loves Mary Jane (all Marvel Comics)
Margaret Stohl - writer, Mighty Captain Marvel, Life of Captain Marvel, Spider-Man Noir (Marvel)
Lilah Sturges - writer, "Jack of Fables", "Everafter", "House of Mystery"
Laurie S. Sutton - writer and editor, DC Comics and Marvel Comics
Babs Tarr - artist, Batgirl (DC Comics)
Cara Sherman Tereno (Arion, Lord of Atlantis, Life With The Vampire)
Jill Thompson - artist and writer, Wonder Woman, Sandman, and her own Scary Godmother series
Kelly Thompson - writer, Hawkeye, Jessica Jones, Captain Marvel, Rogue & Gambit, Mr. & Mrs. X, Black Widow, West Coast Avengers (Marvel)
Maggie Thompson - editor, Comics Buyer's Guide magazine
Kathleen Webb - writer, Betty (Archie Comics)
Christina Weir - writer, Oni Press
G. Willow Wilson - writer, Cairo (Vertigo), Ms. Marvel (Marvel)
Kim Yale - writer/editor, DC Comics, Marvel Comics, First Comics, and Warp Graphics

OEL manga
Tina Anderson - writer, Only Words (Iris Print), Games With Me (The Wild Side), Loud Snow (Gynocrat INK)
Jo Chen - artist, Digital Manga's In These Words
Becky Cloonan - artist, AiT/Planet Lar's Demo
Alex de Campi - writer, Kat & Mouse (Tokyopop)
Amy Kim Ganter - artist/writer, Sorcerers & Secretaries (Tokyopop)
Holly Golightly a.k.a. Holly G!, Fauve - artist/writer, School Bites (Broadsword Comics)
Priscilla Hamby - artist
Lea Hernandez - artist, Marvel Comics' Marvel Mangaverse: Punisher
Gisele Lagace - artist, writer, Pixie Trix Comix, Archie Comics
Nina Matsumoto - artist/writer, "Yōkaiden" (Del Rey Manga)
Amy Reeder - artist/writer, Fool's Gold (Tokyopop)
Rivkah - artist/writer, Steady Beat (Tokyopop)

Alternative comics
Jessica Abel - (La Perdida)
Donna Barr - (Stinz, The Desert Peach)
Alison Bechdel - (Dykes to Watch Out For)
Gabrielle Bell - (Lucky)
Lee Binswanger
Angela Bocage - (Nice Girls Don't Talk About Sex, Religion and Politics)
Joyce Brabner - Our Cancer Year
Paige Braddock - Jane's World
Vera Brosgol
M.K. Brown - (Aunt Mary's Kitchen, Dr. N!Godatu)
Dot Bucher
Nancy Burton, also known as Nancy Kalish or Hurricane Nancy - (Gentle's Tripout, contributed to It Ain't Me, Babe)
Sophie Campbell - (Too Much Hopeless Savages, Spooked)
Jennifer Camper
Carole - (published in Breakin' Out in It Ain't Me, Babe)
Geneviève Castrée
Chynna Clugston - (Blue Monday)
Colleen Coover - (Small Favors)
Molly Crabapple - (Scarlett Takes Mahattan, Backstage at Act-i-vate)
Sophie Crumb - (Belly Button)
Dame Darcy - (Meat Cake)
Vanessa Davis - (Spaniel Rage, Make Me a Woman)
Abby Denson - (Tough Love: High School Confidential)
Diane DiMassa - Hothead Paisan - Homicidal Lesbian Terrorist
Colleen Doran - (A Distant Soil)
Julie Doucet - (Dirty Plotte)
Debbie Dreschler
Sarah Dyer
Joyce Farmer - (Tits & Clits Comix)
Karen Favreau - creator, So It Goes...
Emil Ferris
Jess Fink - creator, Chester 5000 XYV (Top Shelf)
Ali Fitzgerald - (Drawn to Berlin)
Mary Fleener - (Fleener (Zongo Comics)
Shary Flenniken - (Trots and Bonnie)
Ellen Forney - (I Love Led Zeppelin)
Shaenon Garrity - (Narbonic)
Melinda Gebbie - (Lost Girls)
Nicole Georges - (Invincible Summer)
Roz Gibson - (Jack Salem)
Tatiana Gill
Phoebe Gloeckner - creator, A Child's Life and The Diary of a Teenage Girl
Roberta Gregory - (Naughty Bits)
Mary Hanson-Roberts - (Here Comes A Candle)
Jessie Hartland - (Steve Jobs: Insanely Great!)
Maria Hoey - (works with her brother Peter Hoey on the series Coin-Op)
G.B. Jones
Megan Kelso - (Artichoke Tales)
Lucy Knisley - (French Milk, Relish, An Age of License, Displacement (Fantagraphics), Something New)
Aline Kominsky-Crumb - (The Bunch, Dirty Laundry Comix)
Krystine Kryttre
Carol Lay — (Story Minute, Way Lay)
Hope Larson  - (Gray Horses and Salamander Dream)
Amara Leipzig
Caryn Leschen - (Ask Aunt Violet)
Marisa Acocella Marchetto - (Cancer Vixen)
Carla Speed McNeil - (Finder)
Linda Medley
Erika Moen - (DAR!; artist, Bucko (Dark Horse Comics), Oh Joy Sex Toy
Diane Noomin - (DiDi Glitz)
Christine Norrie - (Hopeless Savages)
Liz Prince  - (Will You Still Love Me If I Wet the Bed)
Trina Robbins - (Ms. Tree)
Vanessa Satone - (Wasted Minds)
Mari Schaal - (Estrus)
Gail Schlesser
Ariel Schrag - (Awkward)
Dori Seda - 
Tara Seibel - (co-creator/artist/writer, Rock City Terminally Ill  (Newcity)
Christine Shields
Carole Sobocinski
Raina Telgemeier - (Smile (A Dental Drama))
Carol Tyler - (The Job Thing)
Serena Valentino - (Slave Labor Graphics, Gloom Cookie)
Sara Varon
Lauren Weinstein - (The Goddess of War)
Julia Wertz - (Fart Party, Drinking at the Movies)
Kate Worley - (Omaha the Cat Dancer)
Catherine Yronwode - (editor-in-chief of Eclipse Comics)

Comic strips
Isabella Bannerman - (Six Chix)
Lynda Barry - (Ernie Pook's Comeek)
Sandra Bell-Lundy - (Between Friends)
Barbara Brandon-Croft - (Where I'm Coming From)
Marjorie Henderson Buell - (Little Lulu)
Carol Carlson - (The Adventures of Waddles)
Kate Carew - (Handy Andy, The Angel Child)
Nellie Caroll - (Lady Chatter)
Natalie d'Arbeloff - (Augustine, Blaugustine)
Melissa DeJesus - (My Cage)
Edwina Dumm - (The Meanderings of Minnie; Cap Stubbs and Tippie)
Jan Eliot - (Stone Soup)
Emily Flake - (Lulu Eightball)
Allison Garwood - (moo)
Anne Gibbons - (Eve 'n Steven, continued Six Chix)
Jan Green - (Hey Swingy! (also known as Julie))
Cathy Guisewite - (Cathy)
Alex Hallatt - (Arctic Circle)
Marion Hull Hammel - (continued Goofus and Gallant)
Leslie Harrington - (continued Goofus and Gallant)
Marian Henley - (Maxine, The Little Bald Headed Girl)
Bunny Hoest - (writer The Lockhorns)
Nicole Hollander - (Sylvia)
Judith Hunt - (Evangeline, The Timbertoes)
Olivia Jaimes - (current author of Nancy)
Kelley Jarvis - (continued comics starring Tom & Jerry, Mighty Mouse)
Lynn Johnston - (For Better or For Worse)
Carolyn Kelly - (worked on Pogo)
Selby Kelly - (worked on Pogo)
Terri Libenson - (The Pajama Diaries)
Marty Links - (Emmy Lou)
Karen Matchette (worked on Dennis the Menace, The Flintstones comics and assisted on For Better or For Worse).
Anni Matsick - (continued Goofus and Gallant)
Linda Medley
Dale Messick - (Brenda Starr, Reporter)
Karen Montague-Reyes - (Clear Blue Water)
Gladys Parker - (Mopsy)
Stephanie Piro - (Fair Game, Six Chix)
Mary Schmich -  (final writer of Brenda Starr, Reporter (1985-2011))
Margaret Shulock - (Apartment 3-G, Six Chix)
Elena Steier - (The Ramp Rats, The Goth Scouts, The Vampire Bed and Breakfast)
Hilda Terry - (Teena)
Carla Ventresca - (On A Claire Day, continued Six Chix)
Maurieta Wellman - (Goofus and Gallant)

Uruguay
 Raquel Orzuj

Chile
 Elena Poirier

Asia

China
Shuhui Wang
Zhang Xiaobai - (Si loin et si proche)
Luo Yin

India
Shreyas Krishnan
Parismita Singh

Iran
Marjane Satrapi - (Persepolis)

Israel
 Mira Friedmann
 Batia Kolton
 Rutu Modan
 Elisheva Nadal

Japan
Chako Abeno - (Sola, My-Otome Zwei)
Akira Amano - (Reborn!)
Kozue Amano - (Aria)
Yasuko Aoike
Kotomi Aoki - (Boku wa Imōto ni Koi o Suru, Kanojo wa Uso o Aishisugiteru)
Ume Aoki - (Hidamari Sketch)
Kiyoko Arai - (Angel Lip, Ask Dr. Rin!)
Hiromu Arakawa - (Fullmetal Alchemist)
Sakura Asagi
Yū Asagiri - (Golden Cain, Midnight Panther)
George Asakura - (A Perfect Day for Love Letters)
Hinako Ashihara - (Sand Chronicles, Forbidden Dance, Piece - Kanojo no Kioku)
Izumi Aso
Yuki Azuma - (Schoolmate)
Ippongi Bang
Toriko Chiya - (Clover, Tokyo Alice) 
Nanae Chrono - (Peacemaker Kurogane, Senki Senki Momotama, Vassalord)
Clamp - (RG Veda, Magic Knight Rayearth, Cardcaptor Sakura, 	Angelic Layer, Chobits, Tsubasa: Reservoir Chronicle, xxxHolic)
Eiki Eiki - (Dear Myself, Train Train, Color
 - (Shinobi Life)
Nariko Enomoto
Mihona Fujii - (Gals!)
 - (Kyō wa Kaisha Yasumimasu.)
Kazuko Fujita - (Makoto Call!, Four Steps to Romance)
Cocoa Fujiwara - (dear, Inu x Boku SS)
Hiro Fujiwara - (Kaichō wa Maid-sama!)
Moto Hagio
Machiko Hasegawa - (Sazae-san)
Nanae Haruno
Bisco Hatori - (Ouran High School Host Club)
Akiko Higashimura - (Kisekae Yuka-chan, Himawari - Kenichi Legend, Mama ha Temparish)
Asa Higuchi - (Big Windup!)
Tachibana Higuchi - (Portrait of M and N, Gakuen Alice)
Aoi Hiiragi - (Mimi wo Sumaseba)
Matsuri Hino - (Vampire Knight)
Saki Hiwatari - (Please Save My Earth, Internal Magic)
Katsura Hoshino - (D.Gray-man)
Chieko Hosokawa - (Attention Please, Crest of the Royal Family)
Yumi Hotta -  (writer of Hikaru no Go)
Hozumi - (Shiki no Zenjitsu, Sayonara Sorcier)
Yukari Ichijo
Yumiko Igarashi
Riyoko Ikeda - (The Rose of Versailles)
Satomi Ikezawa - (Guru Guru Pon-chan, Othello)
Gō Ikeyamada - (Uwasa no Midori-kun!!, Suki Desu Suzuki-kun!!, Kobayashi ga Kawai Sugite Tsurai!!)
Ryo Ikuemi - (Bara-Iro no Ashita, Kiyoku Yawaku)
Sukune Inugami - (Kashimashi: Girl Meets Girl, Renai Distortion, Ashita mo Kotokoto)
Risa Itō - (Oi Pītan!!, Oruchuban Ebichu)
Natsumi Itsuki
Mariko Iwadate
Kaneyoshi Izumi - (Sonnanja neyo)
Yuna Kagesaki - (Chibi Vampire)
Narumi Kakinouchi - (illustrator of Yakushiji Ryōko no Kaiki Jikenbo, Vampire Princess Miyu)
Yoko Kamio - (Boys Over Flowers, Cat Street)
Aya Kanno - (Soul Rescue, Blank Slate, Otomen)
Junko Karube
Haruko Kashiwagi - (Hanazono Merry Go Round)
Kazune Kawahara - (High School Debut, writer of My Love Story!!)
Yumiko Kawahara
Mizuki Kawashita - (Strawberry 100%, First Love Limited, Anedoki)
Kazumi Kazui - (Dōse Mō Nigerarenai)
Izumi Kazuto - (Binbō Shimai Monogatari)
Toshie Kihara
Renjūrō Kindaichi (金田一蓮十郎) - (Liar x Liar)
Yuki Kiriga
Miyuki Kobayashi
Momoko Kōda - (Heroine Shikkaku)
Yun Kōga
Fumiyo Kōno - (Town of Evening Calm, Country of Cherry Blossoms, Kono Sekai no Katasumi ni)
Mitsurō Kubo  - (Moteki and Again!)
 -  (Terrarium in Drawer, Dungeon Meshi)
Fusako Kuramochi
Yuki Kure
Maki Kusumoto - (Kissxxxx, V. Eye, K no Souretsu - The Funeral Procession of K, Die Tödliche Dolis)
Kei Kusunoki - (Girls Saurus, Ogre Slayer, Diabolo, Bitter Virgin)
Nao Maita (まいた菜穂) - (Age 12)
Miyako Maki
Sanami Matoh - (Fake, By the Sword)
Naoko Matsuda (ja) - (Jūhan Shuttai!)
Temari Matsumoto - (Kyo Kara Maoh!, Just My Luck, The Loudest Whisper: Uwasa No Futari, Shinobu Kokoro: Hidden Heart, Cause of My Teacher)
Akemi Matsunae
Hibari Meguro (目黒ひばり) - (Seiyū Mashimashi Club)
Mitsukazu Mihara - (IC in a Sunflower, Beautiful People, Doll, Haunted House, R.I.P.: Requiem in Phonybrian, The Embalmer)
Rin Mikimoto (ja) - (Kin Kyori Renai, Kyō no Kira-kun)
Kanan Minami - (Kyō, Koi o Hajimemasu)
Kazuka Minami - (My Paranoid Next Door Neighbor)
Tōko Minami (ja) - (ReRe Hello)
Ai Minase (ja) - (Hachimitsu ni Hatsukoi)
Kazuya Minekura - (Saiyuki, Wild Adapter, Saiyuki Ibun, Saiyuki Reload Blast)
Suzue Miuchi
Kyoko Mizuki - (writer Candy Candy)
Hideko Mizuno - (Fire!, Honey Honey no Suteki na Bouken)
Junko Mizuno - (Pure Trance)
Setona Mizushiro - (X-Day, After School Nightmare)
Jun Mochizuki - (Pandora Hearts) 
 - (Deka Wanko, Gokusen, Kōdai-ke no Hitobito)
Milk Morinaga - (Kuchibiru Tameiki Sakurairo, Girl Friends)
Akiko Morishima - (Hanjuku-Joshi)
Suu Morishita (森下suu) - (Like a Butterfly)
Milk Morizono
Maki Murakami
Mayu Murata (村田真優) - (Nagareboshi Lens)
Mayumi Muroyama
Aya Nakahara - (Love Com, Berry Dynamite)
Hisaya Nakajo - (Hana-Kimi, Sugar Princess) 
Hikaru Nakamura - (Arakawa Under the Bridge, Saint Young Men) 
Yoshiki Nakamura - (Skip Beat!, Tokyo Crazy Paradise)
Junko Nakano (中野純子) - (B-Shock!, Chisa × Pon, Hetakoi)
 - (Parfait Tic!)
Kiriko Nananan - (blue, Strawberry Shortcakes) 
Atsuko Nanba (南波あつこ) - (Senpai to Kanojo)
Minako Narita - (Cipher, Alexandrite, Hana Yori mo Hana no Gotoku)
Tomoko Ninomiya - (Nodame Cantabile) 
Keiko Nishi - (Sanban-chō Hagiwara-ya no Bijin, Love Song) 
Yoshiko Nishitani
Miho Obana - (Kodomo no Omocha)
Akane Ogura - (Zettai Heiwa Daisakusen)
Saori Oguri - (Is He Turning Japanese?)
Shinobu Ohtaka - (Sumomomo Momomo, Magi: The Labyrinth of Magic)
Reiko Okano - (Fancy Dance)
Hiromu Ono - (Lady Love)
Natsume Ono - (Ristorante Paradiso, House of Five Leaves)
Yumiko Ōshima - (The Star of Cottonland)
Minami Ozaki
Mari Ozawa
Peach-Pit
Marimo Ragawa - (Baby and Me)
Akizuki Risu
Robico - (My Little Monster)
Rieko Saibara - (Bokunchi, Mainichi Kaasan, Onnanoko Monogatari, Jōkyō Monogatari)
Fumi Saimon
Mayu Sakai - (Rockin' Heaven)
Io Sakisaka - (Strobe Edge)
Momoko Sakura - (Chibi Maruko-chan)
Koharu Sakuraba - (Kyō no Go no Ni, Minami-ke)
Kanoko Sakurakoji - (Backstage Prince, Black Bird)
Erica Sakurazawa
Machiko Satonaka
Karuho Shiina - (Kimi ni Todoke)
 - creator of 37.5°C no Namida
Reiko Shimizu
Takako Shimura - (Aoi Hana, Wandering Son)
Chie Shinohara - (Ao no Fūin, Romance of Darkness, Red River, Purple Eyes in the Dark)
Mayu Shinjo - (Sensual Phrase, Akuma na Eros, Haou Airen, Love Celeb, Ai Ore!-
Aya Shouoto - (S.L.H Stray Love Hearts!, Kiss of Rose Princess, He's My Only Vampire)
Yuki Suetsugu - (Chihayafuru)
 - (Boku Girl)
Miwako Sugiyama (杉山美和子) - (True Love)
Fuyumi Soryo
Keiko Suenobu - (Life, Limit) 
Hinako Sugiura
Hiro Suzuhira - (Ginban Kaleidoscope)
Julietta Suzuki
Haruko Tachiiri
Megumi Tachikawa
Kaoru Tada
Rumiko Takahashi - (Urusei Yatsura, Ranma ½, InuYasha)
Hinako Takanaga - (Challengers, Little Butterfly, Liberty Liberty!, The Tyrant Falls in Love)
Rica Takashima - (Rica 'tte Kanji!?)
Natsuki Takaya - (Phantom Dream, Tsubasa: Those with Wings, Songs to Make You Smile, Fruits Basket, Hoshi wa Utau, Liselotte and Witch's Forest)
Yuyuko Takemiya - (writer of Evergreen) 
Naoko Takeuchi - (Sailor Moon)
Keiko Tobe - (With the Light)
Yana Toboso - (Black Butler)
Asami Tojo (東城麻美) - (Chimera, X-Kai, Thunderbolt Boys Excite, Love Prism, Only You)
Ichigo Takano (ja) - (Yume Miru Taiyō, Orange)
Yumi Tamura - (Basara, Chicago, 7 Seeds)
Yellow Tanabe - (Kekkaishi)
Meca Tanaka - (Meteor Prince) 
Arina Tanemura - (Full Moon o Sagashite, Kamikaze Kaito Jeanne, Sakura Hime: The Legend of Princess Sakura) 
Ema Tōyama - (Pixie Pop, Koko ni iru yo!) 
Masami Tsuda - (Kare Kano, Eensy Weensy Monster, Chotto Edo Made) 
Mikiyo Tsuda - (The Day of Revolution, Family Complex, Princess Princess) 
Shungicu Uchida - (Minami-kun no Koibito) 
Miwa Ueda - (Peach Girl)
Kimiko Uehara
Chica Umino - (Honey and Clover, March Comes in Like a Lion)
Tsunami Umino (ja) - (Nigeru wa Haji da ga Yaku ni Tatsu)
Yuki Urushibara - (Mushishi)
Masako Watanabe
Taeko Watanabe - (Hajime-chan ga Ichiban!, Kaze Hikaru) 
Yuu Watase - (Fushigi Yūgi, Ceres, Celestial Legend, Absolute Boyfriend) 
Yū Yabūchi - (Mizuiro Jidai, Naisho no Tsubomi, Hitohira no Koi ga Furu)
Murasaki Yamada
Ryoko Yamagishi
Ebine Yamaji
Sumika Yamamoto
Kazumi Yamashita - (The Life of Genius Professor Yanagizawa)
Kyoko Yamashita
Waki Yamato
Mari Yamazaki - (Thermae Romae) 
Ai Yazawa - (Nana (manga))
Akimi Yoshida
Yuki Yoshihara
Miki Yoshikawa - (Yankee-kun to Megane-chan) 
Fumi Yoshinaga - (Antique Bakery, Ōoku: The Inner Chambers) 
Wataru Yoshizumi - (Handsome na Kanojo, Marmalade Boy, Ultra Maniac)
Kaori Yuki - (Earl Cain, Angel Sanctuary)
Sumomo Yumeka
Yumi Unita (ja) - (Sukimasuki, Bunny Drop)

Kazakhstan 
Dilyara Nassyrova

Lebanon 
Zeina Abirached

Malaysia 
Sandra Khoo - (Claude and Chunkie)

Mongolia 
 Zolzaya Batkhuyag

South Korea
Iwan - (Jiburo Ganeungil, Jumping). 
Lee Jung-Hyoun
Kwon Gyo-jung
Kwon Yoon-joo - (Snowcat)
Kang Kyung-ok
Lee So-young
 You - (born in South Korea, later moved to Belgium)

Taiwan
 Belle Yang - (Hannah Is My Name, Forget Sorrow: An Ancestral Tale)

Europe

Austria
Dora Dimow
Marianne Frimberger (Die Fünf Negerlein)
Ulli Lust: Ignatz Award-winning Today is the Last Day of the Rest of Your Life
Hella Schiefer
Else Weichberger
Susi Weigel
Susanne Wenger

Belgium
Rosita Cappaert (born as a woman, later became a transgender man) - (Cleef Combe, scriptwriter of De Ever en de Roos)
Eva Cardon, aka Ephameron - (Us Two, Together)
Nathalie Carpentier
Chayé
May Claerhout - (made comics for the magazine Ohee)
Veerle Colle - (Colle, graphic novel based on the film Ben X)
Antoinette Collin - (Les Naufragés de l'Escalator, Christobald)
Nine Culliford - (wife of Peyo, who colorized his comics).
Blanche Dumoulin - (made comics for Spirou and was the wife of Rob-Vel).
Carine De Brab
Marianne Duvivier
Liliane Funcken - (made comics for the magazine Tintin with her husband Fred)
Dominique Gillain
Jeanne and Laure Hovine - (Nic et Nac), notable for being the first Belgian female comics artists.
Ilah - (Cordelia)
Nina Jacqmin - (La Tristesse de l'Éléphant)
Kari (advertising comics)
Karo
Greet Liégeois - (scripted Bessy and ghosted Silberpfeil)
Viviane Nicaise
Erika Raven - (Ripley, Thomas Rindt)
 Séraphine, aka Séraphine Claeys
Cécile Schmitz
Tonet Timmermans
Sylvia Tops - (Team Lou)
Ann Van de Velde, aka Carrie Anne - (Ridder Geert)
Leen van Hulst
Katrien Van Schuylenbergh - (Oh Dierbaar Vlaanderen..., Merel)
Judith Vanistendael - (Dance By The Light of the Moon)
Tine Vercruysse
Virginie Vertonghen - (La Vavache)
You - (born in South Korea, later moved to Belgium)

Bosnia
Enisa Bravo
Helena Klakočar

Bulgaria
 Elena Stoilova - (Is Vasko Alive?)

Czechoslovakia/Czech Republic
 Helena Bochořáková-Dittrichová - (Z Mého Dětství (From my Childhood)
Lucie Lomová

Denmark
Birthe Aksby - (Lillegut)
Sussi Bech - (Nofret)
Lillian Brøgger - (Fuglemanden)
Christy Bentzon - (Lone og lille Lasse)
Sofie Louise Dam - (Hviskeleg)
Ida Gantriis - (Frederik og Joachim)
Tatiana Goldberg - (Anima, Kijara)
Carla Hansen - (co-creator of Rasmus Klump)
 - (Lone og Lille Lasse)
Kirsten Hoffmann - (Dorte og Clas)
Line Høj Høstrup - (Det rette element)
Angelica Inigo - (On/off)
Ina Korneliussen - (Små fisk, Æg)
Ingerlise Kristoffersen - (Pigen der ledte efter sin egen skygge)
Sabine Lemire - (Mira)
Anne Mette Kærulf Lorenzen - (Skamlebben)
Tove Norgaard - (continued Rasmus Klump)
Gerda Nystad - (Evas Hverdag)
Kristina Ricken - (Live fra Lolland)
Stine Spedsberg - (Stinestregen, Vox)
Karoline Stjernfelt - (I morgen bliver det bedre)
Frederikke Tornager - (Min nat med dig)
Lisbeth Valgreen - (Gaven, Arret)
Rikke Villadsen - (Et knald til)
Gerda Wegener
Nikoline Werdelin - (Café, Homo Metropolis)
Henriette Westh - (Dorthea)
Pernille Ørum - (Hit-Girl)

Finland
Mari Ahokoivu
Terhi Ekebom
Tove Jansson - (The Moomins)
Arja Kajermo - (Dublin Four, Tuula)
Ina Kallis
Kati Kovàcs
Kaisa Leka
Aino Louhi
Pauliina Mäkelä
Hanneriina Moisseinen
Nora Paakanen - (Ted Dally)
Tiina Paju
Milla Paloniemi - (Kiroileva siilli, Tassutellen)
Kaija Papu
Kati Rapia - (Lonkka, Yellow Bird)
Jenni Rope - (Miss Simon Ginlemon)
Anna Sailamaa - (Paimen)
Katri Supiläinen
Minna Sundberg - (A Redtail's Dream and Stand Still. Stay Silent)
Aino Sutinen
Tiitu Takalo
Katja Tukiainen
Riita Uusitalo
Amanda Vähämäki
Emmi Valve
Julia Vuori - (Sika)

France 
Marguerite Abouet - (Aya of Yopougon)
Peggy Adam - (Luchadoras)
Lucie Albon - (Le Voeu de Marc)
Algésiras
Aurélia Aurita
Pénélope Bagieu - (My Quite Fascinating Life, Joséphine)
Anne Baltus
Stéphanie Bellat - (Princesse Libellule)
Françoise Bertier - (Line)
Claire Bouilhac – (Francis Blaireau Farceur )
Marie-Madeleine Bourdin - (Titounet et Titounette)
Elsa Brants
Claire Bretécher - (Les Frustrés)
Lætitia Brochier
Camille Burger
Marie Caillou
Florence Cestac - (Cestac pour les grands)
Cécile Chicault
Nicole Claveloux 
Daphné Collignon – (Flora et les Étoiles Filantes)
Chloé Cruchaudet
Mariel Dauphin - (comics based on novels)
Clio De Frégon - (Charlie, Ma Vie de Star)
Marie-Christine Demeure
Bernadette Després - (Tom-Tom and Nana)
Isabelle Dethan
Lucie Durbiano
Colonel Moutarde
Marie Duval - (Ally Sloper)
Kate J. Fricero - (Les Distractions de Mll Nini).
Geneviève Gautier (created the comic Les Aventures du Pingouin Alfred at age 95, making her the oldest person to ever debut as a comics artist.)
Hélène Georges
Annie Goetzinger - (Félina, Aurore, La Demoiselle de la Légion d'honneur, Agence Hardy)
Virginie Greiner – (Secrets)
Anne Guillard - (Valentine, Ma Vie d'Ado, Les Pipelettes)
Joly Guth
Loo Hui Phang
Manon Iessel - (Capucine)
Catherine Labey (born in France, later moved to Portugal)
Oriane Lassus – (Spongiculture)
Sandrine Lemoult
Samantha Leriche-Gionet (Boum) - (Boumeries)
Patricia Lyfoung - (La Rose Écarlate)
Lisa Mandel
Jul Maroh - (Blue Is the Warmest Colour)
Catherine Meurisse - (Elza)
Laureline Michaut, aka Laurel - (Le Journal de Carmilla, Cerise, Les Énigmes de Violette)
Marion Montaigne - (Tu Mourras Moins Bête)
Chantal Montellier - (1996)
Aurélien Morinière
Françoise Mouly
Catel Muller
Aurélie Neyret, aka Clo
Collette Pattinger
Françoise Pichard (Chard, Pscharr) 
Marie Pommepuy - (half of the duo Keracoët)
Anouk Ricard
Rosalys
Annick Sadonnet, aka Sadon, Ajol or Sade
Marjane Satrapi (born in Iran, later moved to France) - (Persepolis)
Joëlle Savey
 - (author of The Song of Aglaia (Fantagraphics))
Maly Siri
Solveg  (Betty)
Roxanne Starr
Irène Stegmann
Caroline Sury
Tanxxx
Annette Tison - (Barbapapa)
Vanyda
 Valérie Vernay - (Agathe Saugrenu)
Claire Wendling

Germany 
Franziska Bilek
Naomi Fearn - (Zuckerfish)
Aisha Franz
Kristina Gehrmann - (Im Eisland)
Dagmar Geisler
Cornelia Geppert - (continued Abrafaxe)
Edith Hegenbarth - (worked on Digedags)
Jule K
Kathi Kaeppel
Hyuna Kang
Nora Krug
 Anke Kuhl 
Marie Marcks
Edith Oppenheim-Jonas (born in Germany, spent her life in Switzerland) - (Papa Moll).
Marika Paul
Elizabeth Pich - (War and Peas)
Annegret Reimann
Lona Rietschel - (Abrafaxe)
Elke Steiner
Ulrike Uhlig
Irmtraut Winkler-Wittig - (worked for Hannes Hegen)
Barbara Yelin
Minou Zaribaf
Gisela Zimmermann

Greece 
 Alkmini Grammatopoulou 
 Zoe Skiadaresi - (Bampoudas)

Hungary 
Gabriella Baracsi
Miriam Katin
Lívia Rusz

Italy
 Bianca Bagnarelli 
 Laura Bozzano - (Disney comics)
 Lina Buffolente - (Piccolo Ranger, Comandante Mark)
 Anna Brandoli - (La Strega, Cuba 42)
 Barbara Canepa - (Disney comics)
 Giovanna Casotto
 Barbara Ciardo
 Adriana Cristina - (Disney comics)
 Iris De Paoli
 Anna Maria Falcetti - (Looney Tunes comics, Disney comics, Bobo) 
 Liliana Fantoni
 Monica Ferrone - (Xtina)
 Elena de' Grimani - (Rigel) 
 Adriana Lobello
 Elisabetta Melaranci - (Disney comics)
 Anna Merli - (Disney comics)
 Gabriella Molisso
 Grazia Nidasio - (Valentina Mela Verde, Steffi)
 Sara Pichelli - (Marvel comics)
 Elisa Picuno - (Disney comics)
 Antonella Platano
 Valeria Turati - (Geronimo Stilton, Bobo, Disney comics)
 Antonella Vicari
 Vanna Vinci - (La Bambina Filosofica)
 Luisa Zancanella - (worked on Martin Mystère)
 Melissa Zanella
 Rafaella Zardoni
 Silvia Ziche - (Disney comics)
 Laura Zuccheri - (Hardware, Julia, worked on Ken Parker.)

Ireland
 Elizabeth Shaw - (Sonntagmorgen)

Latvia
Ingrida Picukane
Dace Sietina - (Life Is A Bitch).

Luxemburg
Pascale Velleine - (Jamie Bond)

Netherlands
 Fieke Asscher - (De Rare Belevenissen van Professor Stap-door-den-Tijd)
 B. Carrot - (Alle Dagen Ui)
 Merel Barends
 Marjolein Bastin
 Irene Berbee - (Ulfbehrt, worked on Jan, Jans en de Kinderen) 
 Nelly Bodenheim
 Wilma van den Bosch - (Disney comics)
 Peti Buchel
 Rie Cramer
 Renske de Greef - (Renske Stript)
 Sandra de Haan
 Margreet de Heer - (Discoveries in Comics)
 Dilys de Jong - (5x30)
 Aimée de Jongh - (Snippers)
 Marloes de Vries (Lotta)
 Juliette de Wit
 Els Deckers, aka Vosje
 Mies Deinum
 Marissa Delbressine
 Phiny Dick - (Olle Kapoen, Birre Beer)
 Henrieke Goorhuis - (Het Lastpak)
 Dorith Graef - (Nena's Vlog)
 Fritzi Harmsen van Beek  - (continued Flipje van Tiel)
 Maaike Hartjes - (Maaike's Dagboek)
 Nelleke Haverhals - (Roos)
 Eva Hilhorst
 Gerrie Hondius - (Ansje Tweedehansje)
 Patty Klein - (Noortje)
 Simone Koch - (made a promotional comic for comics store Lambiek)
 Alice Kok -
 Gradie Knipscheer - (Keesje Konijntje)
 Greetje Kroone
 Judy Koot
 Rie Kooyman - (Hoki en Poki)
 Marjolein Krijger
 Andrea Kruis - (continued Jan, Jans en de Kinderen)
 Liesbeth Labeur
 Freddie Langeler  - (Pietje Pluk en Kootje Kwak, Bobby den Speurder, Barendje Kwik, Bello Blafmeier)
 Jolet Leenhouts - (De Vier-Vijf-Zes)
 Lonneke Leever
 Anne van de Leur
 Maia Matches - (born in Canada, moved to the Netherlands) - (Ruby Riveter, Bitch)
 Ellen Meske - (Merik de Meeuw)
 Johanna Bernardina Midderigh-Bokhorst
 Sandra Nieuweboer - (Karin, Beppen)
 Evi Nijs - (Alex en het feest van Jeroen Bosch)
 Coco Ouwerkerk (Acception)
 Georgien Overwater - (Sjanie, Bart en Bob, Hungry Jack)
 Joanika Ring
 Emma Ringelding
 Maartje Schalkx
 Coq Scheltens-Jongkind - (Scoutertje, Dikkie)
 Willy Schermelé
 Marieke Scholten
 Nora Schnitzler - (Keesje Knabbel)
 Willy Smit - (Tijs Wijs De Torenwachter)
 Anne and Eva Staal, aka De Stalinskis .
 Sandra Kleine Staarman
 Barbara Stok - (Barbaraal)
 Gwen Stok - (comics adaptations of the short stories by Toon Tellegen)
 Marlon Teunissen
 Jip van den Toorn - 
 Anne van Baarle - (De Ware Geschiedenis van Aspoetser)
 Nel van Beek - (Dol en Mina)
 Agnes van Belle - (Het zal wel)
 Linda van Bruggen
 Eveline van Dijk - (made comics promoting trepanation, based on the theories of Bart Huges.)
 Linda van Erve
 Nans van Leeuwen - (Piggelmee)
 Harriët van Reek
 Marjorie Velthuyse - (Izzie, Suul & Juul)
 Toby Vos, aka Neeltje Vos
 Marijn Van der Waa - (Hibou) 
 Fiep Westendorp - (Jip en Janneke)
 Henriette Willebeek le Mair
 Nettie van Wijland - (De Avonturen van Tijs Loerendraaier en Dikkie Duik).
 Leny Zwalve

Norway
Anna Fiske
Karine Haaland
Lise Myhre
Solveig Muren Sanden - (continued Tuss og Troll and Smørbukk)
Hanne Sigbjørnsen
Inga Sætre
Vivian Zahl Olsen - (Småtte)

Poland
Elisabeth Brozowska - (Josephine)

Portugal

 María Alcobre
 Bixa - (Laçarote e Pantalonas, 3 de Braço Dado)
 Teresa Camara Pestana
 Maria Isabel Carvalho
 Ana Cortesão
 Helena Dias
 Catherine Labey (born in France, later moved to Portugal)
 Isabel Lobinho
 Ofélia Marques, aka Ofélia
 Susa Monteiro
 Guida Ottolini
 Maria Emília Roque Gameiro, aka Màmia
 Raquel Roque Gameiro
 Joana Rosa (TMG - The Mighty Gang, Dreamland Protectors)
 Joana Mosi
 Joana Afonso (O Bestiário de Isa)
 Joana Lafuente (Transformers) 
 Rita Alfaiate

Romania
Aitch
Louise Hirsch (born in Romania, moved to the U.S.) - (Tessie Tish, Charlie Chirps)
Irina Georgeta Pusztai
Veronica Solomon

Russia
Svetlana Chmakova: artist/Writer, Dramacon (Tokyopop)
Tatyana Gnisiuk
Tanja Neljubina

Scotland
Karrie Fransman - (The House That Groaned, Death of the Artist, The Darkness Behind Our Eyes, Gender Swapped Fairy Tales)
Lorna Miller - (Artist/Writer: Witch - Contributor: Girlfrenzy, The Comics Journal, The Ramones Box Set, Vice, etc. - Artist/Colourist: Thomas the Tank Engine, Toxic, Ben 10, Powerpuff Girls, Moshi Monsters)

Spain
Sònia Albert - (Professor Breinstein, Disney comics)
Meritxell Andreu - (Disney comics)
Lola Anglada
Flavita Banana
Carmen Barbará - (Mary Noticias)
Juliana Bach - (Bunty and Mandy, also known as Marnie en Sanne)
Isabel Bas - (Ana-Emilia y su Familia)
Purita Campos - (Patty's World)
Cristina Durán Costell
Rosa Galcerán
Carmen Levi - (continued Pif le chien, religious comics)
 Pilar Mir - (Ana Belén)
Ana Miralles - (Djinn)
Roser Oduber
Ana Oncina
Pepita Pardell
Maria Pascual Alberich - (Rosa Blancas, Sissi)
Moderna de Pueblo
Laura Pérez Vernetti
Margarita Querol Manzano - (Disney comics)
Raquel Riba
Lourdes Rueda Sala - (Disney comics)

Sweden
Ottilia Adelborg
Christina Alvner - (Coco)
Inger Edelfeldt - (Hondjuret)
Åsa Ekström 
 Michaela Favilla - (worked on the Mamma Mu series) 
Susanne Fredelius
Kerstin Frykstrand - (Muff och Tuff)
 Anneli Furmark
Annika Giannini - (Illustrator Man, Övergångsstället, Roberts vänne, Folk och fä)
Ester Gill - (Lillans Morgongröt, Den Egenkära Gunilla, Sara)
Gunna Grähs

Jenny Holmlund
Johanna Kristiansson - (Katten Nils)
Eva Lindström
Bia Melin (continued Agust och Lotta)
Coco Moodysson
Lina Neidestam
Gunila Stierngranat - (Lila Lena och Jon Blund, Lille Göran och Jon Blund, Lasseman och Hans Vänner, Snövit, Morfars Barndomsminnen, Eva-Maria och Ingegegerd).
Liv Strömquist - (100 Procent)
Minna Sundberg - (A Redtail's Dream, Stand Still, Stay Silent) 
Cecilia Torudd - (Ensamma mamman)
Margit Uppenberg, aka Gobi - (Pian)
Natalie Zimmerman

Switzerland
 Frida Bünzli (pseudonym of Debra Bühlmann-Drenten)
 Odrade
 Edith Oppenheim-Jonas (born in Germany, spent her life in Switzerland) - (Papa Moll).
 Corinne Schroff
 Anna Sommer - (Damen Dramen)
 Valp (Valentine Pasche) - (Lock, Ashrel)
 Judith Zaugg

Turkey
 Selma Emiroğlu 
 Ramize Erer

United Kingdom
Janet Ahlberg
Wendy Arnot - (worked on Rupert Bear)
Mabel Lucie Attwell - (Wot A Life)
Gabrielle Bell - (Lucky)
Hannah Berry - (Britten and Brülightly, Adamtine, Vox Pop, LiveStock, Premeditations)
Hilda Boswell - (Strongheart)
Vera Bowyer
Jenny Butterworth - (Tiffany Jones)
Kate Charlesworth - (Sally Heathcote: Suffragette)
 Katriona Chapman - (Katzine, Follow Me In, Breakwater)
Sue Coe
 Gillian Crampton Smith
Evelyn Flinders - (The Silent Three)
Barbara C. Freeman
Dora Gibbon - (Muffy in Moonland)
Isabel Greenberg - (The Encyclopedia of Early Earth)
Alex Hallatt - (Arctic Circle)
Dawn Hargy - (The Fabulous Baker Girls) 
Laura Howell - (Johnny Bean from Happy Bunny Green, Les Pretend, Tricky Dicky and the manga adaptation of The Beano)
Yvonne Hutton - (worked on Roy of the Rovers)
Helen Jacobs
Lee Kennedy
Jennifer Kisler - (continued Rupert Bear)
 Kat Kon
Sonia Leong
Lucy Matthews - (assisted on Rupert Bear)
Kathleen McDougall - (worked on Rupert Bear)
Marjorie Owens - (worked on Rupert Bear)
Annie Parkhouse
Philippa Perry - (Couch Fiction)
 Dora Royle
Kate Sheppard - (Horrible Histories)
Posy Simmonds - (Gemma Bovery, Tamara Drewe)
Mary M. Talbot - (Sally Heathcote: Suffragette, Dotter of Her Father's Eyes)
Mabel Francis Taylor - (The Little Sparrowkins, continued Jungle Jinks)
Pat Tourret - (Tiffany Jones)
Mary Tourtel - (Rupert Bear)
Inez Townsend (born in the U.K., later moved to the U.S.) - (Gretchen Gratz, Snooks and Snicks, the Mischievous Twins)
Suzy Varty - (Heröine, Mama! dramas, Nelson)
Emma Vieceli
Laura Watton - (Biomecha)

Oceania

Australia
 Dr Jenia Meng
Moira Bertram - (Jo)
Queenie Chan - (The Dreaming, Tokyopop)
Elizabeth Durack - (Nungalla and Jungalla)
Cecilia May Gibbs - (Bib and Bub, Tiggy Touchwood)
Nicki Greenberg 
Sarah Howell
Marguerita - (Zyg & Mea)
Kathleen O'Brien - (Wanda the War Girl)
Mandy Ord
Carolyn Ridsdale
Madeleine Rosca - Hollow Fields
Nicola Scott
Nicole Skeltys - (Pigeon Coup) 
Ruth Vickery - (Betty and Bill)

New Zealand
Sharon Alston - (made comics for Broadsheet)
Kim Casali - (Love is...)

See also
Friends of Lulu
List of 20th century women artists
List of feminist comic books
List of feminist literature
Portrayal of women in American comics
Women artists

References

External links

Complete list of female comics creators in Denmark 1929-2021 (PDF) by Frank Madsen, 2021

Further reading
Horn, Maurice. Women in the Comics (Chelsea House; New York, London; 1977) ; (trade paperback) ISBN o-97754-205-8
Robbins, Trina. A Century of Women Cartoonists (Kitchen Sink, 1993) 
Robbins, Trina. From Girls to Grrrlz: A History of Women's Comics from Teens to Zines (Chronicle, 1999) 
Robbins, Trina. The Great Women Cartoonists (Watson-Guptill, 2001) 
Yronwode, Catherine and Robbins, Trina. Women and the Comics (Eclipse, 1983) 

female comics creators
 
 
Lists of women writers by format
Lists of women artists